Paul Frieden (25 May 1925 – 25 July 2012) was a Luxembourgian long-distance runner. He competed in the men's 5000 metres at the 1952 Summer Olympics.

References

1925 births
2012 deaths
Athletes (track and field) at the 1948 Summer Olympics
Athletes (track and field) at the 1952 Summer Olympics
Luxembourgian male long-distance runners
Luxembourgian male steeplechase runners
Olympic athletes of Luxembourg
Place of birth missing